The runic inscription of debated authenticity discovered in the Kleines Schulerloch cave that was found in 1937, Altmühl valley (near Essing, Bavaria) was not noticed until the 1950s. It reads

birg : leub : selbrade,

probably meaning "Birg, beloved of Selbrad", next to a drawing of an ibex or stag scratched into the stone from perhaps the same time, but whose the authenticity is also debated. The inscription was generally considered to be fake shortly after its discovery.

The discovery of a parallel inscription in grave 172 of the "Unterer Stollen" cemetery in Bad Krozingen in 2001, reading

boba : leub | agirike

revived discussions regarding the authenticity of the Kleines Schulerloch inscription. Still, in 2003, Looijenga concluded that the inscription is an obvious falsification. In 2012, Findell, accepting the Bad Krozingen inscription as genuine, noted that most scholars still objected to its authenticity and considered the Kleines Schulerloch inscription to be at least "suspect".

See also
List of runestones

References
 A. Bammesberger, G. Waxenberger (eds.), Das fuþark und seine einzelsprachlichen Weiterentwicklungen, Walter de Gruyter (2006), 137–393.

Notes

External links
 Die Eiszeitzeichnung vom kleinen Schulerloch (photo of inscription), archived from the original location
 Inscriptions suspected to be falsifications: Kleines Schulerloch , from the Runenprojekt of the University of Kiel, including an extensive list of references

1950s archaeological discoveries
Elder Futhark inscriptions
Inscriptions of disputed origin